Alfred Bashford (23 July 1881 – 31 July 1949) was an English cricketer. He played two first-class matches for Middlesex in 1906.

See also
 List of Middlesex County Cricket Club players

References

External links
 

1881 births
1949 deaths
English cricketers
Middlesex cricketers
Sportspeople from Norfolk
People from Broadland (district)